These are the Billboard Hot Dance/Disco Club Play and 12 Inch Singles Sales number-one hits of 1988.

See also
1988 in music
List of number-one dance hits (United States)
List of artists who reached number one on the U.S. Dance chart

References

1988
1988 record charts
1988 in American music